Vasilescu is a Romanian surname. Notable people with the surname include:

Gheorghe Vasilescu
Laura Vasilescu (born 1984), Romanian handballer
Leluț Vasilescu
Lia Olguța Vasilescu (born 1974), Romanian politician
Nicolae Vasilescu-Karpen (1870–1964), Romanian engineer and physicist
Paraschiv Vasilescu (1864–1925), Romanian general in World War I
Răzvan Vasilescu (born 1954), Romanian actor
Tora Vasilescu (born 1954), Romanian actress

See also 
 Vasile (name)
 Vasiliu (surname)
 Vasilievca (disambiguation)

Romanian-language surnames
Patronymic surnames
Surnames from given names

de:Vasilescu